SEACOM may refer to:

 SEACOM (African cable system), a private venture that owns and operates a submarine cable connecting south and east Africa
 SEACOM (Asian cable system), a telephone cable linking Hong Kong with Malaysia